Dingle is an unincorporated community in Bear Lake County, Idaho.  It is located in the southeastern part of the state. Although unincorporated, it has the zip code 83233.

History
Although a fur trapper and blacksmith named "Peg-Leg Smith" established a trading post on the Oregon Trail from 1848 to 1850 near Dingle, the first permanent settlement at Dingle was made in 1871 by a colony of Mormons.

Dingle's population was 40 in 1909, and was estimated at 100 in 1960.

Notable people
Beulah Ream Allen (1897-1989) physician and WWII POW, who received the Presidential Medal of Freedom.

References

Unincorporated communities in Idaho
Unincorporated communities in Bear Lake County, Idaho